KPQ-FM (102.1 MHz, "The Quake") is a classic rock radio station primarily serving Wenatchee and Central Washington. KPQ-FM operates with an ERP of 35 kW with its city of license being Wenatchee, Washington.

References

External links
Official Website

PQ-FM
Classic rock radio stations in the United States
Radio stations established in 1967
Townsquare Media radio stations